Harold Bernard Rose (27 March 1900 – May 1990) was an English football player and manager.

Playing career
Rose, who played as a centre half, played in the Football League for Reading and Bristol Rovers. He also played for Reading Liberal Club, Imperial, Mid Rhondda United and Ebbw Vale.

Coaching career
Rose managed Dutch side Ajax between 1925 and 1926.

Personal life
He was married to Edith Ward.

References

1900 births
1990 deaths
Sportspeople from Reading, Berkshire
English footballers
Association football defenders
Reading F.C. players
Bristol Rovers F.C. players
English Football League players
Mid Rhondda F.C. players
Ebbw Vale F.C. players
English football managers
AFC Ajax managers
English expatriate football managers
English expatriate sportspeople in the Netherlands
Expatriate football managers in the Netherlands
Footballers from Berkshire